Daturae is a tribe of flowering plants in the subfamily Solanoideae of the family Solanaceae. It comprises three genera: Datura, the Devil's trumpets, Brugmansia, the Angel's trumpets, and the monotypic Trompettia.

Genera

References

External links

Solanoideae
Asterid tribes